TG1 (Telegiornale 1) is the flagship television newscast produced by Rai 1, the main channel of state-owned Italian public broadcaster RAI. It is the longest running program in the history of television in Italy as it has been broadcast daily since 3 January 1954.

It is shown domestically on Rai 1 and across the world on Rai Italia several times throughout the day. The journalist Monica Maggioni is the current editor-in-chief. It was launched as simply Telegiornale, which was later renamed as TG1 in 1975–76. From 1992–93 it was named Telegiornale Uno before reverting to the TG1 name.

Programme format
The programme is generally presented by a single newsreader but with additional newsreaders for the sports. Most items will be made up of reports and are generally preceded and followed by the correspondent reporting live from the scene. The programme is followed by a weather report known as Meteo and a financial news report, known as TG1 Economia.

Criticism and controversies
The Undersecretary to Communications Paolo Romani, member of The People of Freedom, in an interview with the newspaper Il Tempo, has defined that the TG1 "seems politically affiliate with the Centre-left".

However it is criticized by the newspaper la Repubblica for political bias in favour of The People of Freedom party and its leader Silvio Berlusconi, when the politician Antonio Di Pietro requested the dismissal of the editor in chief of TG1 Augusto Minzolini, comparing him to Emilio Fede, editor-in-chief of a newscast broadcated by one of the television channels personally owned by Silvio Berlusconi.

Opening theme
The opening theme for the newscast has been done by an orchestra since its debut in 1952, although the arrangement has been modernised several times, most recently in 2022.

Directors of TG1

Key people 
Director: Monica Maggioni

Central managing editor: Maria Luisa Busi

Chief editor: Daniele Valentini

Deputy chief editor: Alessandra Mancusco

Editions and presenters

TG1 Rassegna stampa 

 Alessio Zucchini
 Elisa Anzaldo
 Giorgia Cardinaletti
 Marco Valerio Lo Prete
 Paola Cervelli

TG1 ore 6:30, 7:00, 8:00, 9:00, 9:05, 9:35 
Andrea Gerli
Gabriella Capparelli
Giuseppe Rizzo
Perla Dipoppa

TG1 Mattina 

 Isabella Romano
 Senio Bonini

TG1 ore 13:30
Emma D’Aquino
Paola Cervelli
Roberto Chinzari
Sonia Sarno
Valentina Bisti

TG1 ore 16:45
From Monday to Sunday at 16:45. Presenters: 

 Barbara Capponi
 Cecilia Primerano
 Francesca Grimaldi
 Gianpiero Scarpati
 Virginia Volpe

TG1 ore 20:00
From Monday to Sunday at 20:00 (35 minutes). Presenters:
Alessio Zucchini
Elisa Anzaldo
Giorgia Cardinaletti

TG1 Sera
From Monday to Sunday at around the 23:00-hour nearly (5 minutes). Presenters:

 Angelo Polimeno Bottai
 Barbara Carfagna
 Dania Mondini
 Micaela Palmieri
 Virginia Lozito

Speciale TG1
This airs only on Sunday at around 23:00. This show is presented by Amedo Martorelli. The coordinated edition was presented by Sergio Fratini and Massimo Proietti.

Programs 
 Porta a Porta
 Rai News 24
 TG1 Mattina
 Unomattina
 Unomattina Estate (summer edition)

See also
TG2
TG3
TGR
Rai News 24

References

External links
https://www.rainews.it/notiziari/tg1/ 

RAI original programming
Mass media in Rome
Italian television news shows
1952 Italian television series debuts
1950s Italian television series
1960s Italian television series
1970s Italian television series
1980s Italian television series
1990s Italian television series
2000s Italian television series
2010s Italian television series
2020s Italian television series